Dimitar Kapinkovski (born 27 May 1975) is a retired Macedonian football player and current coach, which was recently managed FK Pelister as interim coach.

International career
He made his senior debut for Macedonia in a July 2001 friendly match against Qatar and has earned a total of 9 caps, scoring no goals. His final international was an October 2003 friendly away against Ukraine.

Honours
FK Pelister Bitola
Macedonian Football Cup: 2000–01 (winner)
FK Pobeda Prilep
Macedonian First League: 2003–04 (winner); 2006–07 (winner)
Macedonian Football Cup: 2006–07 (runner-up)

References

External links

1975 births
Living people
Sportspeople from Bitola
Association football defenders
Macedonian footballers
North Macedonia international footballers
FK Pelister players
FK Pobeda players
FK Bashkimi players
KF Bylis Ballsh players
FK 11 Oktomvri players
Macedonian First Football League players
Kategoria Superiore players
Kategoria e Parë players
Macedonian Second Football League players
Macedonian expatriate footballers
Expatriate footballers in Albania
Macedonian expatriate sportspeople in Albania
Macedonian football managers
FK Pelister managers